Spontaneous Inventions is a 1986 live album by American vocalist Bobby McFerrin, released by Blue Note Records.

The album reached number 103 on the Billboard 200, number 62 on Billboard's R&B Albums chart, number 6 on the Top Jazz Albums chart, and number 2 on the Top Contemporary Jazz Albums chart.

The album features special guests, amongst them Robin Williams (vocals on "Beverly Hills Blues") and Herbie Hancock (piano on "Turtle Shoes").

McFerrin later performed a modified version of the song Thinkin' About Your Body in a series of UK Cadbury's chocolate adverts in 1989/1990.

Track listing

Personnel
Cheryl Bentyne – Vocal Arrangement, Vocals
Bruce Botnick, Judy Clapp, Leslie Ann Jones, Elliot Scheiner – Engineer
Linda Goldstein, Tim Hauser – Producer
Herbie Hancock – Piano
Tim Hauser, Jon Hendricks, Janis Siegel, Robin Williams – Vocals
Mary Mack – Photography
The Manhattan Transfer – Group, Vocals
Bobby McFerrin – Bass, Percussion, Producer, Vocal Arrangement, Vocals
Paula Scher – Design
Rhonda Schoen – Digital Editing
Wayne Shorter – Sax (Soprano)
Jack Skinner – Mastering

References

1986 albums
Bobby McFerrin albums
Blue Note Records albums